"A Little More Summertime" is a song written by Jerry Flowers, Tony Martin, and Wendell Mobley and recorded by American country music artist Jason Aldean. It was released on July 15, 2016 as the second single from Aldean's 2016 album, They Don't Know

Critical reception
The song debuted at No. 30 on the Country Airplay chart. The following week when it was released for sale, it debuted at No. 16 in the Hot Country Songs chart, selling 35,000 copies in the United States. The song has sold 202,000 copies in the US as of November 2016.

Music video
The music video was directed by Shaun Silva and premiered in September 2016.
The video was shot in Santa Cruz, California, USA

Charts

Weekly charts

Year end charts

References

2016 singles
2016 songs
Jason Aldean songs
BBR Music Group singles
Music videos directed by Shaun Silva
Song recordings produced by Michael Knox (record producer)
Songs written by Jerry Flowers
Songs written by Tony Martin (songwriter)
Songs written by Wendell Mobley